Aptenopedes is a genus of spur-throated grasshoppers in the family Acrididae. There are about 13 described species in Aptenopedes.

Species
These 13 species belong to the genus Aptenopedes:

 Aptenopedes appalachee Hebard, 1936 c g
 Aptenopedes aptera Scudder, 1878 i b (wingless Florida grasshopper)
 Aptenopedes chefixico Otte, D., 2014 c g
 Aptenopedes chiaha Otte, D., 2014 c g
 Aptenopedes clara Rehn, J.A.G., 1902 c g
 Aptenopedes hubbelli Hebard, 1936 i
 Aptenopedes menawai Otte, D., 2014 c g
 Aptenopedes nigropicta Hebard, 1936 i
 Aptenopedes robusta Hebard, 1936 i
 Aptenopedes rufovittata Scudder, 1878 i c g
 Aptenopedes sphenarioides Scudder, 1878 i c g b (linear-winged grasshopper)
 Aptenopedes sphenax Otte, D., 2014 c g
 Aptenopedes yoholoi Otte, D., 2014 c g

Data sources: i = ITIS, c = Catalogue of Life, g = GBIF, b = Bugguide.net

References

Further reading

 
 

Melanoplinae
Articles created by Qbugbot